The House at 116 West Davis Boulevard is a historic home in Tampa, Florida, United States. It is located at 116 West Davis Boulevard. On August 3, 1989, it was added to the U.S. National Register of Historic Places. Designed by architect Franklin O. Adams, Jr. and built in 1925, it is an example of the Mediterranean Revival style.

References

Gallery

Houses in Tampa, Florida
History of Tampa, Florida
Houses on the National Register of Historic Places in Hillsborough County, Florida
Mediterranean Revival architecture of Davis Islands, Tampa, Florida
1925 establishments in Florida